Gorazi (also Romanized as Gorāzī; also known as Gūrāzī) is a village in Kheyrgu Rural District, Alamarvdasht District, Lamerd County, Fars Province, Iran. At the 2006 census, its population was 55, in 13 families.

References 

Populated places in Lamerd County